The 2011 Maaco Bowl Las Vegas, the 20th edition of the game, was a postseason American college football bowl game, held on December 22, 2011, at Sam Boyd Stadium in Whitney, Nevada, as part of the 2011–12 NCAA Bowl season.

The game, televised on ESPN, was between the Arizona State Sun Devils from the Pac-12 Conference and the Boise State Broncos from the Mountain West Conference.

Teams

Meeting for the second time in history, the Broncos and the Sun Devils had previously met with the then No. 5 Arizona State defeating Boise State 56–7 in Tempe, Arizona, on 5 October 1996. However, Boise State claims a three-game winning streak over Pac-12 teams, winning over Oregon twice and Oregon State in 2010 when all three teams were ranked.

Arizona State

On 4 December 2011, the Arizona State Sun Devils accepted an invitation to represent the Pac-12. The Sun Devils entered the bowl with a 6–6 record. On 28 November, their coach Dennis Erickson was fired after the Sun Devils had four consecutive losses following a 6–2 start. However, Erickson was allowed to coach the team at the Las Vegas Bowl. The 2011 Maaco Bowl Las Vegas was ASU's first post-season appearance since the 2007 Holiday Bowl.

Boise State

On 4 December 2011, the Boise State Broncos accepted an invitation to represent the MWC. The Broncos entered the bowl ranked #7 in the BCS standings with an 11–1 record, finishing second in the Mountain West Conference. The Broncos only loss in the season was against TCU, costing the team a chance at the BCS National Championship Game. The Broncos had appeared in the Las Vegas Bowl the previous year, winning 26–3 against Utah. The 2011 Maaco Bowl Las Vegas was the final college game for Kellen Moore, the most successful quarterback in FBS history.

Game summary
Despite committing three turnovers, the Boise State Broncos easily routed the Arizona State Sun Devils 56–24.

The Broncos scored quickly when Doug Martin returned a kickoff 100 yards for a touchdown to make it 7–0 Broncos. Boise State went up 14–0 on a 14-yard touchdown pass to Tyler Shoemaker. The Broncos made it 21–0 in the 2nd quarter on a touchdown pass to wide receiver Matt Miller. The Sun Devils finally scored with a 32-yard Alex Garoutte field goal to cut the deficit to 21–3. Boise State responded with a pass from Matt Miller to Kyle Efaw on a trick play to make the score 28–3 going into the half.

Arizona State scored quickly to begin the 2nd half when Rashad Ross returned the kickoff 98 yards for a touchdown, making it 28–10. ASU attempted an onside kick but was recovered by BSU. On their next possession, the Broncos turned the ball over on a Kellen Moore interception, but Arizona State turned it back to the Broncos on downs. Broncos then again turned it over on a fumbled snap. The Sun Devils, taking advantage of the turnover, drove to the Broncos' 1-yard line. On a 4th down play, Brock Osweiler's pass was intercepted by Jamar Taylor, who returned it 100-yards for a touchdown to put the Broncos up 35–10.

In the 4th quarter, the Broncos scored 2 more touchdowns, including 1 fumble return touchdown, to make it 49–10. ASU finally got its first offensive touchdown of the game on a 21-yard pass from Osweiler to Gerell Robinson to make it 49–17. The two teams then traded touchdowns to end the game with a final score of 56–24.

A few records were set at the 2011 Maaco Bowl Las Vegas. The Boise State Broncos became the first FBS team to win 50 games in a 4-year period. The Broncos also set a bowl record in points scored at 56. ASU's Gerell Robinson had a bowl-record 241-yard receiving, while BSU's Doug Martin finished with 301 all-purpose yards, another Las Vegas Bowl record.

Scoring summary
Source

Statistics

References

2011–12 NCAA football bowl games
2011
2011
2011
December 2011 sports events in the United States
2011 in sports in Nevada
21st century in Las Vegas